The 1871 Kentucky gubernatorial election was held on August 7, 1871. Incumbent Democrat Preston Leslie defeated Republican nominee John Marshall Harlan with 58.61% of the vote.

General election

Candidates
Preston Leslie, Democratic
John Marshall Harlan, Republican

Campaigning
The two candidates campaigned in a somewhat unusual fashion. They traveled together, often speaking to the same audiences on the same stages where they debated. They were personally cordial and often shared lodging during the campaign.

The gubernatorial election was the first in Kentucky since Black sufferage.

Results

References

1871
Kentucky
Gubernatorial